Luelmo is a municipality located in the province of Zamora, Castile and León, Spain; and in the territorial area of Sayago. According to the 2004 census (INE), the municipality has a population of 228 inhabitants.

The landscape of the municipality is dominated by the Sayaguese peneplain, succeeding hills and streams leading to Duero river.

References

Municipalities of the Province of Zamora